Kuoleman laulukunnaat is Mokoma's fifth album, which was released in 2006. It is a concept album about an ended relationship.

Track listing
 "Valapatto" – 2:59 "Perjurer"
 "Ärräpää" – 3:49 "F-word"
 "Kuu saa valtansa auringolta" – 4:19 "Sun yields might to the moon"
 "Pahaa verta" – 3:07 "Bad blood"
 "Mieli sydäntä syyttää" – 3:26 "Mind accuses the heart"
 "Täyttä ymmärrystä vailla" – 3:04 "Non compos mentis"
 "Tulkki" – 3:35 "Interpreter"
 "Itken silmät päästäni" – 5:38 "I cry my eyes out"
 "Tästä on hyvä jatkaa" – 3:26 "I´ll carry on from here"
 "Säästä sanasi" – 3:41 "Spare your words"
 "Lujaa tekoa" – 3:36 "Made to last"

Personnel

 Marko Annala - vocals
 Kuisma Aalto - guitar, backing vocals
 Tuomo Saikkonen - guitar, backing vocals
 Janne Hyrkäs - drums
 Santtu Hämäläinen – bass

2006 albums
Mokoma albums